Chinatown, Cleveland were two distinctly named places:
 Old Chinatown, Cleveland (Rockwell Avenue Chinatown), defunct since 2006, which sits west of Interstate 90
 St. Clair-Superior, known as "Chinatown Cleveland" prior to 2006, now known as "Asiatown", which sits east of Interstate 90

Cleveland